Peoria City may refer to:

 Peoria, Arizona
 Peoria, Illinois
 City of Peoria Township, Peoria County, Illinois, sometimes called Peoria City Township
 Peoria City (soccer), a soccer team in USL League Two